Nam Thanh is a former district of Hải Hưng province. It was formed on February 24, 1979, from merger of Nam Sách and Thanh Hà districts.

References 

Former districts of Vietnam